is a subway station on the Tokyo Metro Hanzōmon Line and the Toei Ōedo Line in Koto, Tokyo, Japan, jointly operated by the two Tokyo subway operators Tokyo Metro, Toei Subway.

Some trains on both lines terminate and originate at this station.

Station layout

Toei platforms

Platforms 2 and 3 serve the same track, with some trains terminating and starting at this platform.

Tokyo Metro platforms

History 
The Toei Ōedo Line station opened on December 12, 2000. The Hanzōmon Line station opened on March 19, 2003.

The station facilities of the Hanzōmon Line were inherited by Tokyo Metro after the privatization of the Teito Rapid Transit Authority (TRTA) in 2004.

Passenger statistics
In fiscal 2013, the Tokyo Metro station was the least used on the Hanzōmon line and the 78th-busiest on the Tokyo Metro network as a whole with an average of 47,192 passengers daily. Over the same fiscal year, the Toei station was used by an average of 17,430 passengers daily (boarding passengers only). The passenger statistics for the Tokyo Metro station in previous years are as shown below.

References

External links

 Kiyosumi-shirakawa Station information (Tokyo Metro) 
 Kiyosumi-shirakawa Station information (Toei) 

Railway stations in Tokyo
Railway stations in Japan opened in 2000